Declared monuments of Ho Chi Minh City are structures and places that are listed to be protected.

Proposed monuments

Monuments

District 1

District 5

District 11

District Bình Thạnh

Ho Chi Minh City
Monuments and memorials in Vietnam